Irene Schmidt is a retired Dutch table tennis player who competed at the 1972, 1976 and 1980 Summer Paralympics in the individual and team events. She won one gold and one bronze medal in 1972, two gold medals in 1976 and again two gold medals in 1980. After these Games she ended her sports career and married Theo Louwers.

References 

Year of birth missing (living people)
Dutch female table tennis players
Table tennis players at the 1972 Summer Paralympics
Table tennis players at the 1976 Summer Paralympics
Table tennis players at the 1980 Summer Paralympics
Paralympic table tennis players of the Netherlands
Medalists at the 1972 Summer Paralympics
Medalists at the 1976 Summer Paralympics
Medalists at the 1980 Summer Paralympics
Paralympic medalists in table tennis
Paralympic gold medalists for the Netherlands
Paralympic bronze medalists for the Netherlands
Living people